Belostoma minor is a species of giant water bug in the family Belostomatidae. It is found in the northern Caribbean bioregion, with records in Cuba, the Dominican Republic, Jamaica, Puerto Rico, U.S. Virgin Islands, and southern Florida in the continental United States.

References

Belostomatidae
Hemiptera of North America
Taxa named by Palisot de Beauvois
Insects described in 1805